Maria-Lena Weiss (born 04 April 1981) is a German politician for the CDU and since 2021 member of the Bundestag, the federal diet.

Life and politics 
Weiss was born 1981 in the West German town of Tuttlingen and studied law at the University of Konstanz.

Weiss was elected directly to the Bundestag in 2021.

References 

Living people
People from Tuttlingen
1981 births
Christian Democratic Union of Germany politicians
21st-century German politicians
Members of the Bundestag 2021–2025